The Charles Ziemer House is a Colonial Revival style house located in Kingman, Arizona. The house is listed on the National Register of Historic Places.

Description 
The Charles Ziemer House is located at 507 East Oak Street in Kingman, Arizona. It was built in 1898 in the Colonial Revival style and is on the National Register of Historic Places both for its architecture and its significance in the history of Kingman. The builder of the house, Charles Ziemer, was a local businessman and mine owner who lived in Kingman from at least 1886 to his death in 1902.  The house is currently a private residence.

References

Houses completed in 1898
Houses in Kingman, Arizona
Houses on the National Register of Historic Places in Arizona
National Register of Historic Places in Kingman, Arizona